Lewisport may refer to:

Lewisport, Kentucky
Lewisporte, Newfoundland and Labrador
Lewisport, Virginia, early name of what is now West Union, West Virginia